The Hirth 2704 and 2706 are a family of in-line twin cylinder, two stroke, carburetted aircraft engines, with optional fuel injection, designed for use on ultralight aircraft and especially two seat ultralight trainers, single seat gyrocopters and small homebuilts. It was manufactured by Hirth of Germany.

The series is out of production and were replaced by the Hirth 3202 and 3203 in May 2002.

Development
The 2706 was developed as a competitor to the  Rotax 582 and is similar to the Rotax powerplant in being a two-cylinder in-line engine, with dual capacitor discharge ignition, although it is air-cooled, compared to the 582's liquid cooling. The 2704 was developed from the 2706 as a de-rated version to compete with the  Rotax 503.

Both the 2704 and 2706 use free air or fan cooling, with dual Bing 34mm slide carburetors or optionally fuel injection. The cylinder walls are electrochemically coated with Nikasil. Standard starting is recoil start with electric start as an option. The reduction drive system available is the G-50 gearbox, with reduction ratios of 2.16:1, 2.29:1, 2.59:1, 3.16:1, or 3.65:1.

The engines run on a 50:1 pre-mix of unleaded 93 octane auto fuel and oil, or optionally 100:1 oil injection.

Variants
2704
Twin-cylinder in-line, two stroke, aircraft engine with a single or dual Bing 34mm slide carburetor or fuel injection. Produces  at 5500 rpm and has a factory rated TBO of 1200 hours. Still in production.
2706
Twin-cylinder in-line, two stroke, aircraft engine with dual Bing 34mm slide carburetor or fuel injection. Produces  at 6200 rpm and has a factory rated TBO of 1000 hours. The 2706 was replaced in production in May 2002 by the Hirth 3203.

Applications
2704

2706

Specifications (2704)

See also

References

External links
Official 2704 page on Archive.org
Official 2706 page on Archive.org

Hirth aircraft engines
Air-cooled aircraft piston engines
Two-stroke aircraft piston engines